Downshire railway station serves eastern Carrickfergus in County Antrim, Northern Ireland.

This station opened on 1 April 1925 and was known for most of its early life as Downshire Park. Northern Ireland Railways renamed the halt in the late 1970s. The station's signposts prior to the 2008 refurbishment named the station as "Downshire Halt", a name by which the station is still locally known.

The Belfast-bound platform was extended during summer 2011 to allow longer trains to operate. The Larne-bound platform was similarly refurbished in early 2012.

Service

At peak times some trains terminate at Larne Town.

On Saturdays, the service remains half-hourly with the same alternating pattern, and there are less peak services.

On Sundays, the service reduces to an hourly operation in both directions.

References

Railway stations in County Antrim
Railway stations opened in 1925
Railway stations served by NI Railways
Railway stations in Northern Ireland opened in the 20th century